Under One Roof is an American drama television series that aired on CBS from March 14 to April 18, 1995. A family drama, the series starred James Earl Jones, Joe Morton and Vanessa Bell Calloway.

Synopsis
Under One Roof follows the lives of three generations of a middle class African American family sharing a two-family house in Seattle, Washington. The lower unit is occupied by family patriarch Nesbit "Neb" Langston (Jones), a recently widowed police officer who has adopted a troubled foster child, Marcus Henry (Merlin Santana). Neb's daughter Ayesha (Monique Ridge) also lives with them.

The upper unit is occupied by Neb's adult son Ron (Morton), his wife and his children.  Ron is a former Marine who is attempting to deal with the stress of opening his own business. Meanwhile, Ron's wife Maggie (Calloway) is having reservations about re-entering the workforce after being a stay-at-home mom for the couple's two children, son Derrick (Ronald Joshua Scott), a Type 1 diabetic, and daughter Charlie (Essence Atkins).

The series, which was a midseason replacement for CBS, was cancelled after six episodes. It later reran on cable network TV One in the mid-2000s.

Cast and characters

Main
Joe Morton  as Ron Langston
Vanessa Bell Calloway as Margaret "Maggie" Louise Langston
James Earl Jones as Nesbit "Neb" Langston
Essence Atkins as Charlotte "Charlie" Langston
Merlin Santana as Marcus Henry
Monique Ridge  as Ayesha (née Beverly) Langston
Ronald Joshua Scott as Derrick Langston

Recurring
Terence Knox as Matt "Siggy" Sigalos

Production
Many scenes were filmed in the old Ballard High School and the Phinney Neighborhood Center in Seattle.

Episodes

Awards and nominations

References

External links
 

1995 American television series debuts
1995 American television series endings
1990s American black television series
1990s American drama television series
CBS original programming
English-language television shows
Television series about families
Television shows set in Seattle